Ljudet av ett annat hjärta/En samling is a compilation album by Swedish pop group Gyllene Tider and was released on 10 September 1997. EMI released this low price album as a part of a whole series of albums by Swedish artists and the CDs were mainly supposed to be sold at gas stations and convenience stores.

Track listing 
"Skicka ett vykort, älskling" ("Send Me a Postcard")
 "Revolver upp"
 "(Dansar inte lika bra som) Sjömän"
 "Ska vi älska så ska vi älska till Buddy Holly"
 "Marie i växeln"
 "Det hjärta som brinner"
 "Du spelar svår att nå"
 "Chrissie, hur mår du?"
 "Kärleken är inte blind (men ganska närsynt)"
 "Ljudet av ett annat hjärta"
 "Teena"
 "(Hon vill ha) Puls"
 "Kustvägen söderut"
 "Vandrar i ett sommarregn"
 "Händerna"

References

1997 compilation albums
Gyllene Tider compilation albums